The 11th Pan American Games were held in Havana, Cuba from August 2 to August 18, 1991.

Medals

Gold

Women's Long Jump: Diane Guthrie-Gresham
Women's 4 × 100 m Relay: Dahlia Duhaney, Merlene Frazer, Cheryl-Ann Phillips, and Beverly McDonald

Silver

Women's 400 metres hurdles: Deon Hemmings

Bronze

Women's 100 metres: Beverly McDonald
Women's 200 metres: Merlene Frazer
Men's 4 × 400 m Relay: Michael Anderson, Howard Burnett, Seymour Fagan, and Patrick O'Connor
Women's 4 × 400 m Relay: Vivienne Spence, Cathy Rattray-Williams, Sandie Richards, and Inez Turner

Men's Lightweight (– 60 kilograms): Delroy Leslie

Results by event

See also
Jamaica at the 1990 Commonwealth Games
Jamaica at the 1992 Summer Olympics

Nations at the 1991 Pan American Games
P
1991